Palaeobalistum goedeli is an extinct species of prehistoric ray-finned fish that lived during the Cretaceous period.

Fossils of this species have been found in Lebanon in the sediments of the Cenomanian Age (99.6 - 93.5 million years ago).

Description
Body is laterally compressed with an almost circular outline and a large snout. Teeth are columnar and thick, indicating a durophagous existence, breaking shells and crustaceans.

References

Prehistoric ray-finned fish
Pycnodontiformes
Cretaceous bony fish